Mack C. Chase (born April 29, 1931) is an American oil and natural gas businessman, who made his money in the oilfields of the Permian Basin in Texas and New Mexico.

Early life
Mack C. Chase was born on April 29, 1931, the fourth of eight children of Edgar and Marie Chase. He started work in the oil industry at age 14, and after graduating from Artesia High School in 1950, went to work for Nash, Winfor and Brown. He served in the US Army form 1951 to 1953 as an A&E mechanic.

Career
Chase worked on oilwells with his father and brother George, before starting his own business in 1968.

In 1979, he went into partnership with John R. Gray and started the pumping services company Marbob Energy, before expanding into drilling, but they split soon after 1991. Chase started Mack Energy, which in 2007 sold much of its property to Concho Resources.

Chase is still active in oil, and owns Chase Farms and Deerhorn Aviation. As of June 2017, Chase is the richest person in New Mexico.

Personal life
In 1953, Chase, aged 22, married Marilyn Yvonne Stack, who was 18. They have three children, Robert, Richard and Gerene. She died in 2016, shortly after their 63rd wedding anniversary. He lives in Artesia, New Mexico.

References

1931 births
Living people
People from Artesia, New Mexico